Aqai (also Romanized as Āqā’ī; also known as Āgoya and Ākūyeh) is a village in Japelaq-e Gharbi Rural District, Japelaq District, Azna County, Lorestan Province, Iran. At the 2006 census, its population was 172, in 36 families.

References 

Towns and villages in Azna County